Murat Özyeğin (born January 10, 1976, in Istanbul) is a Turkish businessman. He is a second-generation member of one of the wealthiest families of Turkey, and son of a self-made billionaire Hüsnü Özyeğin. He is a member of the executive board of FIBA Holding and a member of the board of trustees of Özyeğin University.

Biography
He received his BS in Industry Management and Economics (double major) from Carnegie Mellon University in 1998 and MBA from Harvard Business School In 2003. He began his career as a financial analyst within the Mergers & Acquisitions Group at Bear Stearns in New York City. He moved to their London office in 2000 as a senior analyst.

He established the Strategy and Business Development Departments of Finansbank and FIBA Holding after his return to Turkey in 2003.

He was elected as the chairman of the board of Endeavor Turkey for two consecutive terms. He currently serves as an executive board member of Hüsnü M. Özyeğin Foundation, TÜSİAD, member of the board of trustees of Ozyegin University and WWF, Member of Global Relations Forum and Member of Global Advisory Council of Harvard University. On January 1, 2017, he was appointed as the honorary council of Singapore to Istanbul and to Izmir.

Murat Özyegin has two daughters and a son.

See also
 Hüsnü Özyeğin
 Fiba Holding
 Özyeğin University
 Credit Europe Bank

References

External links
 FIBA Holding
 Özyeğin University
 

1976 births
Living people
Harvard Business School alumni
People from İzmir
Murat Ozyegin
Turkish billionaires
Carnegie Mellon University alumni